Ronald Earle Huston (born April 8, 1945 in Manitou, Manitoba) is a Canadian retired professional ice hockey forward who played 79 games in the National Hockey League for the California Golden Seals.  He would also play 159 games in the World Hockey Association for the Phoenix Roadrunners.  Huston returned to the Western International Hockey League for the start of the 1977-78 season as a member of the Spokane Flyers and led the league in scoring with 119 points.  He followed the Spokane Flyers to the Pacific Hockey League the following season.  When the Pacific Hockey League folded at the end of the 1978-79 season, he once again returned to the WIHL for the 1979-80 season, this time as a player-coach of the Cranbrook Royals, a team where he started his playing career after he completed his time in junior hockey with the Brandon Wheat Kings.  He would continue his role as a player-coach when he moved on to the Elk Valley Blazers of the WIHL from the 1980-81 to the 1982-83 seasons.

After his retirement as a player, Huston worked as an electrician, a trade that he started when he was a member of the Cranbrook Royals in the latter half of the 1960s.

Career statistics

External links
 

1945 births
Living people
Brandon Wheat Kings players
California Golden Seals players
Canadian expatriate ice hockey players in the United States
Canadian ice hockey centres
Ice hockey people from Manitoba
Jersey Devils players
People from Manitou, Manitoba
Phoenix Roadrunners (WHA) players
Portland Buckaroos players
Salt Lake Golden Eagles (WHL) players
Seattle Totems (WHL) players
Spokane Flyers players